English singer Samantha Fox has released six studio albums, five compilation albums, five remix albums, two box sets, 36 singles (including four as a featured artist), six video albums, and 21 music videos.

Albums

Studio albums

Compilation albums

Remix albums

Box sets

Singles

As lead artist

As featured artist

Guest appearances

Videography

Video albums

Music videos

References

External links
 
 
 
 

Discographies of British artists
Pop music discographies